Raymond "Sonny" Workman (May 24, 1909 – August 21, 1966) was an American National Champion and Hall of Fame jockey in Thoroughbred horse racing. During his fifteen years as a professional rider from 1926 through 1940, he won an exceptional twenty percent of his starts.

Born in Hoboken, New Jersey, Raymond Workman's mother was a native of Washington, D.C. and after her husband's death she and the children returned to live there. Workman studied to be a member of the clergy before deciding to embark upon a career as a jockey. He began riding at age seventeen at racetracks in Ohio where he quickly demonstrated a natural riding ability combined with a strong desire to excel. Widely known by the nickname "Sonny," his competitiveness was such that the Chicago Tribune called him a "riding demon" and the New York Times called him a "bulldog in silks." His abilities quickly reached a level that in just his second year of racing he signed a contract to go to New York City to ride for one of the country's preeminent owners, Harry Payne Whitney. He was also the regular rider for Cornelius Vanderbilt Whitney's stables and in 1932 and 1933 he and Whitney's handicap runner, Equipoise, were the idols of New York racing.

In 1930, Sonny Workman was both the United States Champion Jockey by earnings and Champion by total wins while achieving it with a 27% rate of wins to mounts. In 1932 he was the earnings leader a second time.

On January 21, 1930 he was married to Marion Elizabeth Burch of Washington, D.C.

Triple Crown races
During his career, Sonny Workman competed in four Kentucky Derbys with his best result two fourth-place finishes. He made eight starts in the Preakness Stakes, winning it in his first try in 1928 at age eighteen. From his other Preakness mounts, his best results were a second with Ladysman in 1933 and a third aboard Menow in 1938. He rode in the Belmont Stakes on eight occasions, finishing second five times. He was runner-up with Whichone in 1930, Osculator in 1932, Nimbus in 1933, Firethorn in 1935, and Belay in 1939.

1928 Preakness Stakes
Not entered in that year's Kentucky Derby, Harry Whitney's colt, Victorian with Sonny Workman aboard, won the May 11, 1928 Preakness Stakes at Pimlico Race Course. Making his debut in the Belmont Stakes, Workman rode Victorian to a fifth-place finish.

In 1937, Sonny Workman signed to ride for Alfred Gwynne Vanderbilt Jr. However, for years he had battled weight gain  and his exceptional riding skills were increasingly being hampered by the need for constant dieting. Those weight problems led to his early retirement in 1940, a year in which he became a founding vice-president of the Jockeys' Guild. In 1941 he returned to live in Washington, D. C. where he managed his real estate investments.

In 1956, Raymond Workman was inducted in the United States' National Museum of Racing and Hall of Fame. He died at Georgetown University Hospital in 1966 at age fifty-seven. His second wife and widow, Louise Bryant Workman, died on August 9, 1997.

References

1909 births
1966 deaths
American jockeys
American Champion jockeys
United States Thoroughbred Racing Hall of Fame inductees
Sportspeople from Washington, D.C.
Sportspeople from Hoboken, New Jersey